Battery Path is a pedestrian-only footpath located beneath Government Hill in Central, Hong Kong.  Named after Murray Battery, it stretches from Queen's Road Central to Garden Road.  The path is noted for many historical landmarks situated on it, most notably the Former Central Government Offices, the Former French Mission Building and St. John's Cathedral.

History

During the First Opium War, the British occupied Hong Kong in 1841 and one year later, the territory was ceded to them in the Treaty of Nanking.  The new administration chose the site around present-day Battery Path to build its headquarters and defences. Construction on the path was completed in approximately 1841, at around the same time that its namesake—Murray Battery—was built. At the time, both the path and the battery were located on Hong Kong Island's waterfront with Victoria Harbour. However, it is now situated much farther inland due to the amount of land reclamation that has been undertaken since its opening.

During the early twentieth century, the path was popular with and frequented daily by sedan chair drivers, who would take advantage of the shade provided by the banyan that lined the sides of the road. Although the use of sedan chairs ceased after the 1960s, the trees remain in the same place.

Description and features
From its western end, Battery Path begins at the junction between Queen's Road Central and Ice House Street. It separates from the main thoroughfare through a series of stairs elevating the path above Queen's Road; the stairs are located next to the West Wing of the Former Central Government Offices.  The next landmark on the route is the Former French Mission Building.  Located on 1 Battery Path, this neoclassical building currently houses the Court of Final Appeal. The path ends at the intersection with Garden Road, where St. John's Cathedral is located.

See also
 List of streets and roads in Hong Kong
 Murray Battery

References

External links
 

Central, Hong Kong
Government Hill
1841 establishments in Hong Kong
Roads on Hong Kong Island
 Odonyms referring to a building